{{Speciesbox
| name = South Georgia pipit
| status = LC
| status_system = IUCN3.1
| status_ref = <ref name="iucn status 13 November 2021">{{cite iucn |author=BirdLife International |date=2021 |title=Anthus antarcticus' |volume=2021 |page=e.T22705324A177963150 |doi=10.2305/IUCN.UK.2021-3.RLTS.T22705324A177963150.en |access-date= 1 January 2022}}</ref>
| image = Anthus antarcticus -South Georgia, British overseas territory-8.jpg
| image_caption = On South Georgia, British overseas territory
| genus = Anthus
| species = antarcticus
| authority = Cabanis, 1884
}}

The South Georgia pipit (Anthus antarcticus'') is a sparrow-sized bird only found on the South Georgia archipelago off the Antarctic Peninsula. It is the only songbird in Antarctica, South Georgia's only passerine, and one of the few non-seabirds of the region.

It builds nests from dried grass, usually within tussac grass, and lays four eggs a year. It feeds on small insects and spiders, and beach debris.

It has been threatened by the human introduction of rats, and also by environmental damage caused by humans. It has been chosen as the poster bird of the South Georgia Heritage Trust's Habitat Restoration (Rat Eradication) project, which started eradicating rats on South Georgia in 2011. The project's baiting phase ended in early 2015, and success was confirmed in 2018.

Visitors can see the bird on Prion Island, and on beach's on South Georgia since the eradication project took hold.

Description
The species has long legs and a long hindclaw and a short tail.

References

External links
BirdLife Species Factsheet

South Georgia pipit
Birds of islands of the Atlantic Ocean
Birds of subantarctic islands
Fauna of South Georgia
South Georgia pipit